Iringannur Maha Siva Temple, is an ancient Hindu temple dedicated to Lord Shiva is situated at Iringannur village (Edacheri Panchayath) of Kozhikkode District in Kerala state in India. The temple deity of Iringannur Siva temple is Dakshinamurthy and are located in separate sanctum sanctorums facing east. According to folklore, sage Parasurama has installed the idol and the temple is a part of the 108 famous Shiva temples in Kerala.  This is one of the three Thrikkapaleeswaram temples mentioned in 108 Shiva temples sothram and other two temples situated in Niranam (Niranam Thrikkapaleeswaram Dakshinamurthy Temple) in Pathanamthitta district and Kadachira (Kadachira Sri Thrikkapalam Siva Temple) in Kannur district.

Temple, Architecture 

This is one of the oldest temple of Kozhikode district and is centuries old in Malabar region.  The temple is located in Edacherry Panchayat in Nadapuram. The temple is very beautiful and is built like the Maha temples. The Sanctum Sanctorum with its majestic proportions it shows the Kerala temple architectural style. The two-tiered Sanctum Sanctorum is rectangular with tile roofed. The sanctum sanctorum has four doors, one on each side. The doors on the east side only opened. The eastern doors opens to the presence of lord Dhakshinamurthy, represented by shiva lingom.

The temple is facing to the east. There was a big temple tower in the east. It also believe that the temple deity (Lord Shiva) is in the form of Sada Shiva, besides the seity (Shiva Lingom) n the temple having only two eyes. It is said that village name (Iringannur) derived from temple deity; Iru(two=രണ്ട്) +Kannu(Eyes=കണ്ണുകൾ) +Oor(Place= ഊർ). The Temple is the one of major heritage structure in the Kozhikode district of Vadakara. The Iringannur Shiva temple structure and pond were renovated recently.

Sub Deities 
 Ganapathy
 Ayyappan
 Snake Goddess
 Srikrishnan

See also
 108 Shiva Temples
 Temples of Kerala
 Kadachira Sri Thrikkapalam Siva Temple
 Niranam Thrikkapaleeswaram Dakshinamurthy Temple

Temple Photos

References

108 Shiva Temples
Shiva temples in Kerala
Hindu temples in Kozhikode district